Shahrak-e Rijab (also Romanized as Shahrak-e Rījāb; also known as Rījāb) is a city in Ban Zardeh Rural District, in the Central District of Dalahu County, Kermanshah Province, Iran. At the 2006 census, its population was 800, in 170 families.

History 
Shahrak-e Rijab was historically known as Rijav, whose Kurdish word is a literal term meaning "water drop". However, since the passage of time, it has changed to its current name and is an agricultural and tourist area, due to its picturesque nature.

References 

Populated places in Dalahu County
Cities in Kermanshah Province